Tomás Segovia may refer to:

 Tomás Segovia (footballer), Argentine forward
 Tomás Segovia (poet), Mexican writer